Towanda Historic District is a national historic district located at Towanda, Bradford County, Pennsylvania.  The district includes 440 contributing buildings and 1 contributing site in the central business district and surrounding residential areas of Towanda. The buildings date between about 1830 and 1900, and include notable examples of vernacular and high style Greek Revival, Queen Anne, and Classical Revival style architecture. Notable buildings include the William Means House (1816), Towanda Academy (1835), Dr. Samuel Huston House (c. 1835), Ulysses Mercur House (1851), David Cash House (1845), Presbyterian Church (1855), SS Peter and Paul Church (1869-1879), Hale Opera House (1886), Episcopal Church (1889), Citizens National Bank (1888), Kingsbury / Chamberlain Building (1887), Dan Turner House (1897), Public Library (1897), and the Riverside Cemetery.  Located in the district and separately listed is the Bradford County Courthouse.

It was added to the National Register of Historic Places in 1992.

References

Historic districts on the National Register of Historic Places in Pennsylvania
Greek Revival architecture in Pennsylvania
Queen Anne architecture in Pennsylvania
Neoclassical architecture in Pennsylvania
Buildings and structures in Bradford County, Pennsylvania
National Register of Historic Places in Bradford County, Pennsylvania